Wiki.js is a wiki engine running on Node.js and written in JavaScript. It is free software released under the Affero GNU General Public License. It is available as a self-hosted solution or using "single-click" install on the DigitalOcean and AWS marketplace.

Features

Markdown editor 
Content is written using the Markdown syntax, using a visual editor, and saved directly as Markdown files.

Git-backed storage 
Content is continuously synced with a remote Git repository, which serves both as a backup and single source of truth in case of restores or multiple servers setup. Git in 2.x is optional and can be replaced with other storage providers.

Integrated access control 
Access can be given to all or specific sections of the wiki. Guest view is supported. More integrations are planned to be added in the next major upgrade to Wiki.js.

Authentication 
Authentication with Wiki.js can be done in many ways. Some popular authentication methods are Local Authentication, LDAP/Active Directory, Google OAuth, GitHub or SAML 2.0. With future updates, more providers are being added such as Microsoft and Central Authentication Service.

Assets management 
Media content such as images, videos, documents or any type of files can be inserted into content. Assets can be classified under folders and thumbnails are automatically generated for compatible media.

Built-in search engine 
All content is automatically indexed and accessible from any page via the search bar. Administrators have the ability to use external search engines if required.

System requirements 
Prerequisites for running Wiki.js 2.x:
 Node.js 10.12 or later
 PostgreSQL 9.5 or later, or MySQL 8.0 or later, or MariaDB 10.2.7 or later, or SQLite 3.9 or later, or MS SQL server 2012 or later.

Prerequisites for running Wiki.js 1.x:
 Node.js 6.11.1 or later
 MongoDB 3.2 or later
 A public or private Git repository (Any standard Git server, GitHub, GitLab, BitBucket, Visual Studio Team Services, etc.)

License 
Wiki.js is free and open source software and is distributed under the terms of the Affero GNU General Public License.

See also 

 Comparison of wiki software
 List of wiki software

References

External links 
 
 Installation documentation
 

Free content management systems
Free wiki software
2016 software